Voragonema is a genus of hydrozoans belonging to the family Rhopalonematidae. The genus comprises four species. Unlike most hydromedusae, these do not have a sessile stage. Rather, they spend their entire lives in the water column as plankton. Centripetal expansions protruding from the ring canal is a characteristic that separates this genus from other genera in the family Rhopalonematidae.

Species 
Voragonema laciniata
Voragonema pedunculata
Voragonema profundicola
Voragonema tatsunoko

References 

World Register of Marine Species.

Rhopalonematidae
Hydrozoan genera